Clam Union Township is a civil township of Missaukee County in the U.S. state of Michigan. The population was 882 at the 2010 census.

Communities 
 Falmouth is an unincorporated community in the northwest of the township at  
 Prosper is an unincorporated community in the northern part of the township at  A post office operated from July 5, 1901 until May 31, 1914. 
 Vogel Center or Centre, is an unincorporated community in the township at  It was named for John Vogel, the first settler in the township. A post office opened in his store on February 25, 1879, with Arie de jong as the first postmaster. The office was discontinued on May 31, 1914. 
 The city of McBain is to the southwest and the McBain post office with ZIP code 49657 also serves a portion of central Clam Union Township.
 The village of Marion is to the south-southwest in Osceola County, and the Marion post office with ZIP code 49665 also serves an area in southwest Clam Union Township.

Geography

The Clam River flows through the township and also contains the Clam River Dam in the northwest corner.

Demographics
As of the census of 2000, there were 882 people, 311 households, and 238 families residing in the township. The population density was 24.6 per square mile (9.5/km2). There were 473 housing units at an average density of 13.2 per square mile (5.1/km2). The racial makeup of the township was 98.53% White, 0.23% Native American, 0.11% Asian, 0.68% from other races, and 0.45% from two or more races. Hispanic or Latino of any race were 1.25% of the population.

There were 311 households, out of which 40.5% had children under the age of 18 living with them, 68.8% were married couples living together, 5.1% had a female householder with no husband present, and 23.2% were non-families. 21.2% of all households were made up of individuals, and 10.0% had someone living alone who was 65 years of age or older. The average household size was 2.84 and the average family size was 3.29.

In the township the population was spread out, with 33.2% under the age of 18, 8.8% from 18 to 24, 26.4% from 25 to 44, 18.4% from 45 to 64, and 13.2% who were 65 years of age or older. The median age was 33 years. For every 100 females, there were 95.6 males. For every 100 females age 18 and over, there were 96.3 males.

The median income for a household in the township was $35,542, and the median income for a family was $36,793. Males had a median income of $30,078 versus $20,547 for females. The per capita income for the township was $13,542. About 7.7% of families and 10.4% of the population were below the poverty line, including 14.2% of those under age 18 and 6.1% of those age 65 or over.

References 

Townships in Missaukee County, Michigan
Townships in Michigan